The following things have been named after Indira Gandhi, who was Prime Minister of India from 1966–1977 and from 1980 until her assassination in 1984.  A Right to Information query raised in 2013 was answered saying that over 450 schemes, building, projects, institutions, etc. were named after the three family members (Jawaharlal Nehru, Indira Gandhi and Rajiv Gandhi) of Nehru–Gandhi family.

Awards, prizes, and competitions
Indira Gandhi Award for Best Debut Film of a Director
Indira Gandhi Award for National Integration
Indira Gandhi Boat Race
Indira Gandhi Paryavaran Puraskar
Indira Gandhi Prize

Event venues
 Indira Gandhi Arena
 Indira Gandhi Athletic Stadium
 Indira Gandhi International Sports Stadium, Haldwani, Uttarakhand
 Indira Gandhi National Centre for the Arts
 Indira Gandhi Stadium, Alwar
 Indira Gandhi Stadium, Solapur
 Indira Gandhi Stadium (Una)
 Indira Gandhi Stadium, Vijayawada
 Indira Priyadarshini Stadium
 Indira Gandhi Centre for Indian Culture, Phoenix, Mauritius

Hospitals
Indira Gandhi Childrens Hospital
Indira Gandhi Co-operative Hospital
Indira Gandhi Institute of Medical Sciences
Indira Gandhi Medical College
Indira Gandhi Memorial Hospital
North Eastern Indira Gandhi Regional Institute of Health and Medical Sciences

Government programmes

Current
Indira Gandhi National Old Age Pension Scheme
Indira Canteens

Former
Central Government Schemes
Indira Awas Yojana - Ministry of Rural Areas and Environment – This scheme was a CSS funded on cost-sharing basis between the Centre and the States in the ratio of 75:25. In the case of UTs, the entire funds are provided by Centre. The scheme was targeted to provide housing to the population below poverty line living in rural areas, particularly those belonging to SC/ST and freed bonded labourers.
 Indira Gandhi National Old Age Pension Scheme – To Provide Social Security to workers in the Unorganized Sector in a Phased Manner.
Indira Gandhi Canal Project  (Funded by World Bank)
Indira Kisan Vikas Patra
Indira Gandhi Garib Kalyan Yojna

State Government Schemes
Indira Gandhi Utkrishtha Chhattervritti Yojna for Post Plus Two Students - Himachal Pradesh Government (Sponsored by Central Government)
Indira Gandhi Women Protection Scheme - Maharashtra Government
Indira Gandhi Prathisthan - Housing and Urban Planning Department - Uttar Pradesh Government
Indira Kranthi Patham Scheme - Andhra Pradesh Government
Indira Gandhi Nahar Pariyojana Scheme - Kerela Government
Indira Gandhi Vruddha Bhumiheen Shetmajoor Anudan Yojana - Maharashtra Government
Indira Gandhi Nahar Project  (IGNP), Jaisalmer - Rajasthan Government
Indira Gandhi Niradhar Yojna - Maharashtra Government
Indira Gandhi Kuppam - Kerela Government - Welfare Scheme for Tsunami effected fishermen 
Indira Gandhi Drinking Water Scheme, 2006 - Haryana Government
Indira Gandhi Niradhar Old, Landless, Destitute women farm labour Scheme -Maharashtra Government
Indira Gandhi Women Protection Scheme -Maharashtra Government
Indira Gaon Ganga Yojana - Chhattisgarh Government
Indira Sahara Yojana - Chhattisgarh Government
Indira Soochna Shakti Yojana - Chhattisgarh Government
Indira Gandhi Balika Suraksha Yojana - Himachal Pradesh Government
Indira Gandhi Garibi Hatao Yojana (DPIP) - Madhya Pradesh Government
Indira Gandhi super thermal power project - Haryana Government
Indira Gandhi Water Project - Haryana Government
Indira Gandhi Sagar Project, Bhandara District Gosikhurd -Maharashtra Government
Indira Jeevitha Bima Pathakam - Andhra Pradesh Government
Indira Gandhi Priyadarshani Vivah Shagun Yojana - Haryana Government
Indira Mahila Yojana Scheme - Meghalaya Government
Indira Gandhi Calf Rearing Scheme - Chhattisgarh Government
Indira Gandhi Priyadarshini Vivah Shagun Yojana - Haryana Government
Indira Gandhi Calf Rearing Scheme - Andhra Pradesh Government - It helped most of the respondent families in acquiring female calves through this scheme.
Indira Gandhi Landless Agriculture Labour scheme - Maharashtra Government

Museums and parks
Indira Gandhi Planetarium
Indira Gandhi Rashtriya Manav Sangrahalaya
Indira Gandhi Zoological Park

Transport infrastructure
Indira Gandhi Canal
Indira Gandhi International Airport
Annai Indira Gandhi Road Bridge

Universities, colleges, and research institutes
Indira Gandhi Agricultural University
Indira Gandhi Centre for Atomic Research
Indira Gandhi Delhi Technical University for Women
Indira Gandhi Institute of Developmental Research
Indira Gandhi Institute of Medical Sciences
Indira Gandhi Institute of Technology (Delhi)
Indira Gandhi Institute of Technology (Orissa)
Indira Gandhi Medical College
Indira Gandhi National Forest Academy
Indira Gandhi National Open University
 Indira Gandhi Rashtriya Uran Akademi, Raebareli
 Indira Gandhi Institute of Physical Education and Sports Sciences (University Of Delhi)
North Eastern Indira Gandhi Regional Institute of Health and Medical Sciences
Gandhi Memorial International School
 Srimati Indira Gandhi State Secondary School, Quartier Militaire, Mauritius

See also 
 List of things named after B. R. Ambedkar
 List of things named after Jawaharlal Nehru
 List of things named after Mahatma Gandhi

References 

Lists of things named after Indian politicians
Monuments and memorials to Indira Gandhi
Lists relating to prime ministers of India